Quandong is a bounded rural locality in Victoria, Australia,  west of Melbourne's Central Business District, located within the City of Wyndham local government area. Quandong recorded no population at the 2021 census.

It shares its name with a number of wild bush plants and their edible fruits, and is also not to be confused with the locality of Quantong in the Rural City of Horsham.

References

Towns in Victoria (Australia)
Suburbs of the City of Wyndham